Highway 39 (AR 39, Ark. 39, or Hwy. 39) is a designation for two state highways in southeast Arkansas. The western segment of  runs from US Route 49 (US 49) at Blackton to US 49/Highway 241. Another segment of  runs north from Highway 1 and Highway 316 near Turner to US 49 in rural Phillips County.

Route description

Blackton to US 49
The route begins at US 49 at Blackton and runs north to a junction with US 79 in Monroe. The highway turns due west after this intersection until meeting Highway 39 Spur (AR 39S), which connects to US 49. Highway 39 continues to Rich before terminating at a junction of US 49 and Highway 241. A 2010 study of annual average daily traffic (AADT) by the Arkansas State Highway and Transportation Department (AHTD) reveals that no more than 380 vehicles use any portion of the route on a daily basis.

Turner to Hicksville
Highway 39 begins at Highway 1 and Highway 316 near the incorporated community of Turner and runs north to serve as the eastern terminus for Highway 146. The route continues north to Highway 39 Spur, a short spur route to Postelle, before terminating at US 49. The AHTD revealed that the northern part of the route averages the highest AADT, registering 420 vehicles per day in 2010.

History
Arkansas Highway 39 was one of the original 1926 state highways. The route ran north from State Road 1/State Road 25 in Paragould north across State Road 90 and State Road 34 to St. Francis.

Major intersections

Special routes

Monroe County spur

Highway 39 Spur (AR 39S, Ark. 39S, and Hwy. 39S) is an east–west state highway spur route in Monroe County. The route of  serves as a short connector between Highway 39 and US Route 49.

Major intersections

Postelle spur

Highway 39 Spur (AR 39S, Ark. 39S, and Hwy. 39S) is an east–west state highway spur route at Postelle. The route of  serves to connect Postelle to the state highway system via Highway 39.

Major intersections

See also

 List of state highways in Arkansas

References

External links

039
Transportation in Monroe County, Arkansas
Transportation in Phillips County, Arkansas